Hibbertia hooglandii is a species of flowering plant in the family Dilleniaceae and is endemic to the Kimberley region of Western Australia. It is a small, erect or spreading, multi-stemmed shrub with linear leaves and golden yellow flowers arranged singly in leaf axils, with seventeen to twenty-five stamens, all on one side of two densely hairy carpels.

Description
There are seventeen to twenty-five stamens on one side of the two hairy carpels with six to thirteen staminodes in rows outside the stamens. Each of the carpels is more or less spherical and contains two ovules.

Taxonomy
Hibbertia hooglandii was first formally described in 1989 by Judith R. Wheeler in the journal Nuytsia from specimens collected by John Stanley Beard on the Mitchell Plateau in 1979. The specific epithet (hooglandii) honours Ruurd Dirk Hoogland.

Distribution and habitat
This species grows in woodland on rocky slopes, along creeks and on plateaus in the Kimberley region of Western Australia.

Conservation status
Hibbertia hooglandii is classified as "not threatened" by the Western Australian Government Department of Parks and Wildlife.

See also
List of Hibbertia species

References

hooglandii
Flora of Western Australia
Plants described in 1989